Piplia Sisodia, or Pipliya Sisodiya, is a village in the Alot tehsil of Ratlam District of the Indian state of Madhya Pradesh. Before Indian independence, Piplia Sisodia was ruled by Rajputs of the Sisodia clan.

References 

Ratlam
Villages in Ratlam district